WUMD can refer to:

 WUMD (college radio), the on-campus and internet radio station of the University of Michigan-Dearborn
 WNPN, a radio station (89.3 FM) licensed to serve North Dartmouth, Massachusetts, United States, which held the call sign WUMD from 2005 to 2017